The Liquiñe-Ofqui Fault is major geological fault that runs a length of roughly  in a NNE-SSW orientation and exhibits current seismicity. It is located in the Chilean Northern Patagonian Andes. It is a dextral intra-arc strike-slip fault. Most large stratovolcanoes of the Southern Volcanic Zone of the Andes are aligned by the fault which allows for the movement of magma and hydrothermal fluids. 

The fault crosses several transverse faults including the Mocha-Villarrica Fault Zone (MVFZ) and the Biobío-Aluminé Fault Zone. The fault have had periods of ductile deformation associated to pluton emplacement be it either at great depths or by shallow intrusions.   

The forces that move the fault are derivative of the oblique subduction offshore Chile's coast. This leads to partition of deformation between the subduction zone, the fore-arc and the intra-arc region where the fault lies.There is evidence that the fault broke as a 9.07 subevent in the 1960 Valdivia earthquake. A portion of the fault in Aysén Region likely slipped (moved) in an aftershock a few weeks after the 1960 Valdivia earthquake. This same portion slipped again in April 2007 causing earthquakes in Aysén Fjord, triggering landslides and a local tsunami.

The fault name was coined by Francisco Hervé, I. Fuenzalida, E. Araya and A. Solano in 1979. The fault itself was first inferred by Chilean government agent Hans Steffen around 1900 who referred to it as a "tectonic furrow" (Spanish: surco tectónico).

References 

Seismic faults of Chile
Strike-slip faults
Geology of Patagonia
Geology of Araucanía Region
Geology of Los Ríos Region
Geology of Los Lagos Region
Geology of Aysén Region
Taitao Peninsula
Mapuche language